Pallavan Engineering College: (aka Pallavan College of Engineering) is an educational institution of Pallavan Educational Trust, located in Thimmasamudram, a suburban area of Kanchipuram, India. The college is located on the National Highway 4 of National Highways Authority of India.

History 

Pallavan Engineering college was established as a private self-financed engineering college in 1997. At the time of initiation, it was affiliated to University of Madras. Currently it is affiliated to Anna University. It offers 4 year engineering courses to students, who have completed 12 Std (Plus 2) and 3 year courses for students who have a 3 Year Technical Diploma and a SSLC certificate (Lateral Entry Students) .

Campus 

The college campus has 1 ground. The college also has an auditorium, buildings, laboratories and a cafeteria to support its students and staff. It also offers student housing/hostel facilities within the campus.

Pallavan Alumni Association 

Few alumni of this college are occupying various positions in technology and business and pursuing higher education abroad. Recently a dedicated web site has been created, to facilitate the interaction among the Alumni who are spread across the globe. The Alumni Association has initiated several activities some of them are Alumni scholarship guidance, award for international paper publication, sponsoring technical conferences, participating in social activities etc.,

References

 Publication in The Hindu

External links 
 Pallavan Engineering College
 Pallavan Engineering College Alumni

All India Council for Technical Education
Engineering colleges in Tamil Nadu
Universities and colleges in Kanchipuram district
Colleges affiliated to Anna University
Educational institutions established in 1997
1997 establishments in Tamil Nadu